Khushwant Walia is an Indian television actor. He is known for playing the role of Rubel Anuj Deewan in the Star Plus' television series Pyaar Ka Dard Hai Meetha Meetha Pyaara Pyaara. Later Walia also joined the cast of Life OK. Walia was seen in Colors TV's Ishq Ka Rang Safed. He was also seen as Aarav Bharadwaj in Colors TV's Sasural Simar Ka.

Early life
Before acting, he was the Assistant Director in the movie Bodyguard, which starred Salman Khan and Kareena Kapoor. Khan suggested that he try television.

Television

References

13.http://www.tellychakkar.com/tv/tv-news/khushwant-walia-play-the-new-hero-colors-sasural-simar-ka-170403

14.http://www.mijaaj.com/khushwant-walia-play-lead-sasural-simar-ka/

15.https://www.abplive.in/television/sasural-simar-ka-meet-the-new-lead-actor-of-the-show-512916

16.https://timesofindia.indiatimes.com/topic/Khushwant-Walia

1985 births
Indian male television actors
Living people
Place of birth missing (living people)
Ahluwalia